Irene P. M. Muyanga (born 12 November 1943) is a Ugandan sprinter. She competed in the women's 100 metres at the 1964 Summer Olympics. She was the first woman to represent Uganda at the Olympics.

References

External links
 

1943 births
Living people
Athletes (track and field) at the 1964 Summer Olympics
Ugandan female sprinters
Olympic athletes of Uganda
Place of birth missing (living people)
Olympic female sprinters